Tums is  brand of antacid.

Tums may also refer to:

 Tehran University of Medical Sciences (TUMS), located in Tehran, Iran
 Tabriz University of Medical Sciences (TUMS), located in Tabriz, Iran
 Tums Fast Relief 500, a NASCAR Sprint Cup Series stock car race in Martinsville, Virginia

See also 
 Tum (disambiguation)